New Zealand Antarctic Society was formed in 1933 by New Zealand businessman Arthur Leigh Hunt and Antarctic explorers Rear Admiral Richard E. Byrd and Sir Douglas Mawson.

Its aims are:
 to bring together people interested in the region
 to share knowledge of the region
 to foster interest in the region
 to seek and support protection of the Antarctic environment
 to promote New Zealand's interests in the region

Since 1956 it has published a quarterly magazine, Antarctic.

A set of Ross Dependency postage stamps celebrated the society's 50th anniversary in 1983.

The national office is now in Auckland.

References

External links

1934 establishments in New Zealand
Environmental studies organizations
Exploration of Antarctica
 Antarctica research agencies
Antarctic research